Lebia turkestanica is a species of ground beetles in the Harpalinae subfamily that can be found in southern part of Russia and Ukraine.

References

Lebia
Beetles described in 1966
Beetles of Europe